Mateo Sušić (born 18 November 1990) is a Bosnian professional footballer who plays as a right-back for Cypriot First Division club APOEL and the Bosnia and Herzegovina national team.

Sušić started his professional career at Zrinjski Mostar, before joining Istra 1961 in 2010. Three years later, he moved to Energie Cottbus. In 2014, he signed with CFR Cluj. The following year, Sušić was transferred to Sheriff Tiraspol. He went back to CFR Cluj in 2019. In 2022, he switched to APOEL.

A former youth international for Bosnia and Herzegovina, Sušić made his senior international debut in 2016, earning 11 caps since.

Club career

Early career
Sušić started playing football at local clubs, before joining youth academy of his hometown club Zrinjski Mostar in 2007. He made his professional debut in UEFA Europa League qualifier against Vaduz on 31 July 2008 at the age of 17.

In the summer of 2010, Sušić switched to Croatian side Istra 1961. On 30 October, he scored his first professional goal against Karlovac, which secured the victory for his team.

In June 2013, he moved to German outfit Energie Cottbus.

In June 2014, he signed with Romanian club CFR Cluj.

Sheriff Tiraspol
In January 2015, Sušić was transferred to Moldovan side Sheriff Tiraspol for an undisclosed fee. He made his competitive debut for the club against Zaria Bălți on 28 February. On 18 October, he scored his first goal for Sheriff Tiraspol in a triumph over Petrocub.

Sušić was named team captain in March 2016.

He won his first trophy with the club on 30 May, when they were crowned league champions.

In February 2017, he extended his contract until June 2020.

He played his 100th game for Sheriff Tiraspol against Speranța on 7 April 2018.

Return to CFR Cluj
In June 2019, Sušić returned to CFR Cluj on a three-year deal. He played his first official game for the side since coming back in UEFA Champions League qualifier against Astana on 9 July. Four days later, he appeared in his first league game after returning against Politehnica Iași. On 21 December, he scored his first goal for CFR Cluj against Voluntari. He won his first title with the club on 3 August 2020, when they secured league title.

Later stage of career
In June 2022, Sušić joined Cypriot outfit APOEL.

International career
Sušić represented Bosnia and Herzegovina at various youth levels.

In March 2016, he received his first senior call-up, for friendly games against Luxembourg and Switzerland. He debuted against the former on 25 March.

Personal life
Sušić married his long-time girlfriend Ana in May 2014. Together they have two children, a daughter named Rita and a son named Noa.

Career statistics

Club

International

Honours
Zrinjski Mostar
Bosnian Premier League: 2008–09

Sheriff Tiraspol
Moldovan Super Liga: 2015–16, 2016–17, 2017, 2018
Moldovan Cup: 2014–15, 2016–17, 2018–19
Moldovan Super Cup: 2015, 2016

CFR Cluj
Liga I: 2019–20, 2020–21, 2021–22
Supercupa României: 2020

References

External links

1990 births
Living people
Sportspeople from Mostar
Croats of Bosnia and Herzegovina
Bosnia and Herzegovina footballers
Bosnia and Herzegovina youth international footballers
Bosnia and Herzegovina under-21 international footballers
Bosnia and Herzegovina international footballers
Bosnia and Herzegovina expatriate footballers
Association football fullbacks
HŠK Zrinjski Mostar players
NK Istra 1961 players
FC Energie Cottbus players
CFR Cluj players
FC Sheriff Tiraspol players
APOEL FC players
Premier League of Bosnia and Herzegovina players
Croatian Football League players
2. Bundesliga players
Liga I players
Moldovan Super Liga players
Cypriot First Division players
Expatriate footballers in Croatia
Expatriate footballers in Germany
Expatriate footballers in Romania
Expatriate footballers in Moldova
Expatriate footballers in Cyprus
Bosnia and Herzegovina expatriate sportspeople in Croatia
Bosnia and Herzegovina expatriate sportspeople in Germany
Bosnia and Herzegovina expatriate sportspeople in Romania
Bosnia and Herzegovina expatriate sportspeople in Moldova
Bosnia and Herzegovina expatriate sportspeople in Cyprus